Studio Sessions, Chicago 1956 is the first volume of The Private Collection a series documenting recordings made by the American pianist, composer and bandleader Duke Ellington for his personal collection which was first released on the LMR label in 1987 and later on the Saja label.

Reception

The AllMusic review by Scott Yanow awarded the album 3 stars and stated, "Each of the sets has its interesting moments, offering previously unknown compositions and performances".

Writing for The Washington Post, Leonard Feather commented: "One need only listen to the first couple of cuts to be reminded that Ellington's was the greatest jazz orchestra ever, particularly during the years 1939-1970. The clarity of sound is amazing on this prestereo volume."

Track listing
All compositions by Duke Ellington except as indicated.
 "March 19th Blues" (Ellington, Irving Mills) – 5:27  
 "Feet Bone" – 2:42  
 "In a Sentimental Mood" (Ellington, Manny Kurtz, Mills) – 3:05  
 "Discontented" – 3:02  
 "Jump for Joy" (Ellington, Sid Kuller, Paul Francis Webster) – 1:52  
 "Just Scratchin' the Surface" – 3:05
 "Prelude to a Kiss" (Ellington, Irving Gordon, Mills) – 3:29  
 "Miss Lucy" – 3:16  
 "Uncontrived" – 5:12  
 "Satin Doll" (Ellington, Johnny Mercer, Billy Strayhorn) – 2:34  
 "Do Not Disturb" – 2:46  
 "Love You Madly" – 3:21  
 "Short Sheet Cluster" – 2:35  
 "Moon Mist" – 3:27  
 "Long Time Blues" – 8:39  
Recorded at Universal Studios, Chicago on January 3, 1956 (tracks 2, 4, 6, 11 & 15); March 18, 1956 (tracks 9 & 13); March 19, 1956 (tracks 1, 7 & 8); late January 1957 (track 3); and February 1957 (tracks 5, 10, 12 & 14).

Personnel
Duke Ellington – piano
Cat Anderson, Willie Cook, Ray Nance, Clark Terry - trumpet 
Quentin Jackson, Britt Woodman - trombone
John Sanders - valve trombone
Jimmy Hamilton - clarinet, tenor saxophone
Johnny Hodges - alto saxophone 
Russell Procope - alto saxophone, clarinet 
Paul Gonsalves - tenor saxophone 
Harry Carney - baritone saxophone
Jimmy Woode - double bass 
Sam Woodyard - drums

References

Saja Records albums
Duke Ellington albums
1987 albums